Alderman William Dauntesey (or Dauntsey) was a London merchant and Master of the Worshipful Company of Mercers.

A merchant of the Staple at Calais, he was the son of John Dauntesey of West Lavington in Wiltshire.

He died in April 1542. By a Will dated 10 March 1542, Dauntesey gave land in London to the Mercers' Company so that they could build a schoolhouse for a grammar school at West Lavington, and support seven poor people in an almshouse. The school continues today as the private Dauntsey's School.

Part of the bequest reads:
I William Dauntesey Citizen and Alderman of the Cities of London ... will that in West Lavington a house called a church house and a house for a schole be kept ... and that Ambrose Dauntesey shall name and appoint one apt and convenient person to teach gramer in the Schole house...

Notes

Year of birth missing
1542 deaths
Councilmen and Aldermen of the City of London
Founders of English schools and colleges
People from Wiltshire
English merchants
Merchants of the Staple
16th-century English businesspeople